The term lightsail may reference:

 a solar sail for spacecraft propulsion
 LightSail, a solar sail cubesat by The Planetary Society
  Amazon Lightsail, a computing server service